Shunmugham Subramani (born 5 August 1972), commonly known as S. Subramani,  is a former Singapore footballer in the S.League and former defender for the Singapore national football team.

Playing career 
Subramani started his career with Tiong Bahru Constituency Sports Club in 1992. The club would changed its name to Tiong Bahru United Football Club and then Tanjong Pagar United. In 1998, Subramani won the Singapore Cup and Singapore FA Cup in 1998, as well as being named S.League player of the year. 

He signed for Home United in the 1999 season, where he teamed up with his regular partner at international level, Aide Iskandar. 

Subramani retired from football at the age of 37 in 2009.

Coaching career 
Subramani was assistant coach of Singapore's Under-23 team with Kadir Yahaya.

International career 
Subramani made his debut for Singapore on 27 June 1996 in the 4–0 win over Myanmar in an Asian Cup Qualifier.

He played in every game in both the historic 1998 and 2004 triumphant Tiger Cup campaigns. He also played in two SEA Games, reaching the semi-finals in both Jakarta 1997 and Brunei 1999.

Subramani wanted to retire from international football in September 2004 before he was persuaded by coach Radojko Avramović to stay on. He officially retired following Singapore's triumph in the 2007 ASEAN Football Championship.

Subramani was inducted into the FIFA Century Club in June 2007.

Honours

Club
Tanjong Pagar
Singapore Cup: 1998
Singapore FA Cup: 1998

Home United
S.League: 1999, 2003
Singapore Cup: 2000, 2001, 2003, 2005

International
Singapore
ASEAN Football Championship: 1998, 2004, 2007

Individual
S.League Player of the Year: 1998

See also
 List of men's footballers with 100 or more international caps

References

Notes

External links
sleague.com
sleague.com

data2.7m.cn
fas.org.sg

1972 births
Living people
Singaporean people of Tamil descent
Singaporean sportspeople of Indian descent
Singapore international footballers
Singaporean footballers
Tanjong Pagar United FC players
Home United FC players
FIFA Century Club
Singaporean Hindus
Association football defenders
Singapore Premier League players